The 1954 Italian Grand Prix was a Formula One motor race held on 5 September 1954 at Monza. It was race 8 of 9 in the 1954 World Championship of Drivers. The 80-lap race was won by Mercedes driver Juan Manuel Fangio after he started from pole position. Mike Hawthorn finished second for the Ferrari team and his teammates Umberto Maglioli and José Froilán González came in third.

Classification

Qualifying

Race 

Notes
 – Includes 1 point for fastest lap

Shared drive

 Shared Drives: Car #38: Umberto Maglioli (30 laps) and José Froilán González (48 laps)

Championship standings after the race 
Drivers' Championship standings

 Note: Only the top five positions are included. Only the best 5 results counted towards the Championship. Numbers without parentheses are Championship points; numbers in parentheses are total points scored.

References

Italian Grand Prix
Italian Grand Prix
1954 in Italian motorsport